Tachinomyia is a genus of flies in the family Tachinidae.

Species
T. acosta Webber, 1941
T. apicata Curran, 1926
T. cana Webber, 1941
T. dakotensis Webber, 1941
T. floridensis Townsend, 1892
T. montana (Smith, 1917)
T. nigricans Webber, 1941
T. panaetius (Walker, 1849)
T. similis (Williston, 1893)
T. variata Curran, 1926

References

Diptera of North America
Exoristinae
Tachinidae genera
Taxa named by Charles Henry Tyler Townsend